was a co-educational commercial high school located in Shimizu-ku, Shizuoka, Japan. The school was founded in 1921, and is since 2020 permanently closed.

It had a strong soccer program and won the All Japan High School Soccer Tournament three times (1985, 1988, 1993). Many professional association football players were their alumnis.

Prominent footballer alumni of Shimizu Commercial High

Toshiya Fujita
Tadaaki Hirakawa
Takashi Hirano
Yoshikatsu Kawaguchi
Naoya Kikuchi
Daigo Kobayashi
Koki Mizuno
Shigeyoshi Mochizuki
Hiroshi Nanami
Go Oiwa
Shinji Ono
Keisuke Ota
Yukihiko Sato
Makoto Tanaka
Takahiro Yamada

Football honors
All Japan High School Soccer Tournament: 3 titles (1985, 1988, 1993)
Prince Takamado Cup: 6titles (1989, 1990, 1993, 1994, 1995, 2000)

References

High schools in Shizuoka Prefecture
Educational institutions established in 1921
Schools in Shizuoka Prefecture
Buildings and structures in Shizuoka (city)
1921 establishments in Japan